Extreme Cello is an extreme sport and a performance art in which people take a cello to an unusual, often outdoor, location and perform music. It is synonymous with the cello trio known as the Extreme Cellists, an amateur group inspired by the sport of Extreme Ironing. Their performances are generally given to raise money for various charities. Since 2006 the Extreme Cellists have had a particular association with the spinal injuries charity Aspire. 
According to their official website, Extreme Cello aims to "take musical performances to new heights, and depths, by giving performances in many extreme locations."

History 

The formation of the Extreme Cellists in 2003 to raise money for the music fund of Westways Primary School, Sheffield, is believed to have been the first organised Extreme Cello event. Before this, a number of individual cellists are known to have performed in unusual locations but did not use the phrase "Extreme Celling" to describe their activities.

Since then the Extreme Cellists have undertaken a range of challenges, most notably a tour of 42 English cathedral rooftops in 2006. In July 2008 they successfully completed the Four Peaks Challenge, playing at the summits of the tallest mountains in Scotland, England, Wales and Ireland. In 2010, they hiked Wainwright's famous Coast to Coast Walk across northern England, playing as they went. In April 2012, the three Extreme Cellists ran the London Marathon with cellos on their backs, playing occasionally along the way. In 2016 they performed on all 58 surviving seaside piers in Great Britain in just 14 days.

Members 

Jeremy Dawson, lecturer
Clare Wallace, teacher
James Rees, teacher

Musical style 

The group's repertoire is varied. They perform arrangements of classical pieces such as Bach's Wachet Auf, Mozart's Eine Kleine Nachtmusik and the Adagio cantabile from Beethoven's trio for 3 cellos. They also perform more popular pieces such as "Up on the Roof", originally sung by The Drifters, "Climb Every Mountain" from The Sound of Music (Rodgers and Hammerstein), "Hi Ho Silver Lining", originally sung by Jeff Beck; "I'm Forever Blowing Bubbles"; and "Hey Jude" (Lennon & McCartney). Many of the pieces were arranged for cello trio performance by group member Jeremy Dawson.

Performances

Discography 

To date the Extreme Cellists have not released any recordings of their performances although some videos are available on various social media.

References

External links 
 http://www.extremecello.com - the official site of the Extreme Cellists
 https://www.facebook.com/extremecello/ - the group's Facebook page (their predecessor Facebook group was entitled 'We Believe Cellos Should be Played In Weird Locations')
 https://twitter.com/ExtremeCello - the group often use to Twitter to keep fans updated on places and times of pop gigs when on tour or to post photos
 http://www.aspire.org.uk/default.aspx - the site of one of the charities most frequently supported by the group (Aspire)
 https://www.chicks.org.uk - another charity regularly supported by the group (Chicks)
 http://news.bbc.co.uk/1/hi/england/7525725.stm - BBC News item 'New high for Extreme Cellists' -  video

British instrumental musical groups